The following is a list of media in Eugene, Oregon, United States.

Print

Daily 
The Register-Guard - owned by GateHouse Media

Alternative weekly 
Eugene Weekly

Collegiate 

The Emerald - the student newspaper at the University of Oregon, published Mondays and Thursdays
The Torch - the student newspaper at Lane Community College
The Ignite - the newspaper at New Hope Christian College
The Beacon-Bolt - the student newspaper at Bushnell University

Magazines 
Eugene Magazine
Lifestyle Quarterly
Eugene Living
Sustainable Home and Garden

Spanish language 
Adelante Latino

Television 
The Eugene television market is ranked 117th in the nation with 218,200 homes with TVs and 0.204% of the U.S. market. It includes the counties of Lane, Benton, Douglas, and Coos. Among the stations it includes are:

KEZI, Channel 9 - ABC, owned and operated by Allen Media Broadcasting
KVAL, Channel 13 - CBS, owned and operated by the Sinclair Broadcast Group
KMTR, Channel 16 - NBC, owned and operated by Roberts Media, LLC
KEVU-CD, Channel 23 - MyNetworkTV, owned and operated by California Oregon Broadcasting, Inc.
KEPB, Channel 19 - PBS, owned and operated by Oregon Public Broadcasting
KLSR, Channel 34 - Fox, owned and operated by California Oregon Broadcasting, Inc.
KTVC, Channel 36 - 3ABN (licensed to Roseburg)
KHWB-LD, Channel 38 - TBN

Radio

AM Stations
KOAC 550 Corvallis - NPR News/Talk (Oregon Public Broadcasting)
KUGN 590 Eugene - News/Talk (Cumulus)
KXOR 660 Junction City - Spanish Religious (Zion Media)
KKNX 840 Eugene - Classic Hits (Mielke Broadcasting)
KORE 1050 Springfield - FOX Sports Radio
KPNW 1120 Eugene - News/Talk (Bicoastal Media)
KRVM 1280 Eugene - NPR News/Talk (Eugene School District)(JPR affiliate)
KNND 1400 Cottage Grove - Classic Country (Reiten Communications Inc)
KEED 1450 Eugene - Classic Country (Mielke Broadcasting)
KOPB 1600 Eugene - NPR News/Talk (Oregon Public Broadcasting)

FM Stations
KWVA 88.1 Eugene - Freeform (University of Oregon)
KPIJ 88.5 Junction City - Christian (Calvary Satellite Network)(Calvary Chapel)
KQFE 88.9 Springfield - Christian (Family Radio)
KLCC 89.7 Eugene - NPR News/Talk/Jazz (Lane Community College)
KWAX 91.1 Eugene - Classical (University of Oregon)
KRVM 91.9 Eugene - Adult Album Alternative (Eugene School District)
KKNU 93.3 Springfield - Country (McKenzie River Broadcasting)
KMGE 94.5 Eugene - Adult Contemporary (McKenzie River Broadcasting)
KUJZ 95.3 Creswell - Sports (Cumulus)
KZEL 96.1 Eugene - Classic Rock (Cumulus)
KEPW-LP 97.3 Eugene - PeaceWorks Community Radio (Eugene PeaceWorks)
KEQB 97.7 Coburg - Regional Mexican (McKenzie River Broadcasting)
KODZ 99.1 Eugene - Classic Hits (Bicoastal Media)
KRKT 99.9 Albany - Country (Bicoastal Media)
KMME 100.5 Cottage Grove - Catholic Program (Catholic Radio Northwest)
KFLY 101.5 Corvallis - Country (Bicoastal Media)
KEHK 102.3 Brownsville - Hot Adult Contemporary (Cumulus)
KNRQ 103.7 Harrisburg - Alternative Rock (Cumulus)
KDUK 104.7 Florence - Top 40 (Bicoastal Media)
KEUG 105.5 Veneta - Adult Hits (McKenzie River Broadcasting)
KLOO 106.3 Corvallis - Classic Rock (Bicoastal Media)
KLVU 107.1 Sweet Home - Contemporary Christian Music (K-LOVE)(Educational Media Foundation)
KHPE 107.9 Albany - Contemporary Christian Music (Extra Mile Media)

References 

Eugene
Mass media in Eugene, Oregon
Television stations in Eugene, Oregon
Radio stations in Eugene, Oregon